The 3rd Platino Awards were presented at the Centro de Convenciones in Punta del Este, Uruguay on July 24, 2016 to honour the best in Ibero-American films of 2015. 

Embrace of the Serpent and Ixcanul received the most nominations with eight each one.

Embrace of the Serpent won seven awards including Best Ibero-American Film and Platino Award for Best Director for Ciro Guerra.

Winners and nominees

Major awards

Platino Award for Film and Education Values
The Second Mother •

Honorary Platino
Ricardo Darín

Films with multiple nominations and awards 

The following films received multiple nominations:

The following films received multiple awards:

References

External links
Official site

3
Platino Awards
2016 in Uruguay